Karl Lamers (11 November 1935 – 27 August 2022) was a German politician of the Christian Democratic Union (CDU) and former member of the German Bundestag.

Life 
Lamers joined the CDU in 1955. From 1968 to 1971 he was state chairman of the Junge Union in the Rhineland. From 1971 he was a member of the North Rhine-Westphalia CDU state executive committee, from 1975 to 1981 as deputy state chairman. From 1986 to 2005 he was chairman of the CDU's Central Rhine District Association.

From 1990 to 2002, Lamers was foreign policy spokesman for the CDU parliamentary group and chairman of the Foreign Affairs Committee.

References 

1935 births
2022 deaths
Members of the Bundestag for North Rhine-Westphalia
Members of the Bundestag 1998–2002
Members of the Bundestag 1994–1998
Members of the Bundestag 1990–1994
Members of the Bundestag 1987–1990
Members of the Bundestag 1983–1987
Members of the Bundestag 1980–1983
Members of the Bundestag for the Christian Democratic Union of Germany
People from Königswinter
Commanders Crosses of the Order of Merit of the Federal Republic of Germany